Paolo Renosto (10 October 1935 –  10 February 1988) was an Italian composer, conductor and pianist.

Born in Florence, Renosto was educated at the conservatory of his hometown, where he studied piano and composition. He later became a pupil, a collaborator, and friend of Bruno Maderna, who was the official conductor for the world premieres of  two of the most important compositions of Renosto, "Forma op.7" (1968) and "Nacht" (1969). Renosto later dedicated to Maderna's memory the composition "Concerto per pianoforte e orchestra" (1975).

Renosto was author of symphonic, choral, chamber, solo and incidental music compositions. He was also a musical critic and historian, and he collaborated with RAI as creator and host of several radio programs dedicated to contemporary classical music. He also composed, sometimes under the pseudonym Lesiman, theme music for films, TV-programs and documentaries. He died of a heart attack. He taught on the faculty of the Bologna Conservatory where one of his pupils was Chiara Benati.

References

External links
 

1935 births
1988 deaths
20th-century classical composers
20th-century Italian composers
20th-century classical pianists
Academic staff of the Conservatorio Giovanni Battista Martini
Contemporary classical composers
Italian classical composers
Italian classical pianists
Male classical pianists
Italian male pianists
Italian male conductors (music)
Italian film score composers
Italian male classical composers
Italian radio personalities
Italian male film score composers
Musicians from Florence
20th-century Italian conductors (music)
20th-century Italian male musicians